Abdessamad Badaoui (Arabic: عبد الصمد بدوي; born 24 August 1999) is a Moroccan professional footballer who plays as a right-back for Botola club Raja Club Athletic. 
He began his career as a youth player with Raja CA before joining JS Soualem in 2019 where he gained with them their first ever promotion to Botola. In January 2022, he returned to Raja CA

Early life
Abdessamad Badaoui was born on 24 August 1999 in Casablanca. He started playing football in the streets before joining the academy of Raja Club Athletic in the Raja-Oasis Complex.

Club career

Debut with Raja CA
In 2018, Badaoui began to play with the reserves under Abdelilah Fahmi but did not establish himself as a starter.

Transfer to JS Soualem and promotion
In 2019, he joined Jeunesse Sportive Soualem which had just won the 2017-18 Amateur National Championship (D3) under the direction of Redouane El Haimer. In his first season, he quickly became a starter and the team were very close to promotion but finished in fifth place.

The club of Soualem finished second at the end of the 2020–21 Botola 2 one point behind Olympique de Khouribga, meaning they earned their first ever promotion to the first division.

During the summer of 2021, he refuses to sign for RS Berkane despite an agreement reached between Fouzi Lekjaa and Bouchaib Bencheikh, president of JS Soualem.

On 19 December 2021, after a long-term injury, he made his Botola debut against Youssoufia Berrechid and played 10 minutes (loss 1–2). He will start the next games.

Return to Raja CA
On 31 January 2022, Abdessamad Badaoui returns to his former club Raja CA and signed a four and a half year contract.

On 7 April, he played his first match against JS de Kasbah Tadla in the round of 16 of the Throne Cup (0-1 victory).

On 8 October in Niamey, he played his first international match against ASN Nigelec in the second round of the 2022-23 Champions League (victory 0–2).

Notes

References

External links

1999 births
Living people
People from Casablanca
Moroccan footballers
Association football defenders
Raja CA players